Cut Out Shapes are uniquely two different bands inspired by the Magazine song, "Cut Out Shapes".

About 

Their names are inspired  by the Magazine song, "Cut Out Shapes".

Cut Out Shapes-(USA) =Hailing from Northern California, Formed August 1992. Performing gigs, recorded countless garage tapes, 2003 self-titled Compact Disc release. https://www.reverbnation.com/cutoutshapes
Cut Out Shapes- (UK) =Hailing from Leeds.one EP, three singles, and one album https://www.facebook.com/cutoutshapes/
 since forming in November 2009. The (UK) band have been performing gigs around Leeds and Manchester ever since.
C.O.S (UK) supported Chase and Status at Party on The Amp 2011 in May of that year. On 17 September 2011, the band's record label, DI Records put on an alternative rock night at The Library Pub, Leeds, including Cut Out Shapes, Pet Accessories, and The Deratas

Cut Out Shapes-(USA-)-Members
 Andrew U'ren – Percussion,Vocals
 Carlos Aloy - Vocals, Lead Guitar
 Chris Grokenberger Vocals, Bass
 Scott Britton - Vocals, Guitar 
 Kelly Hess- Keyboards
In 2003, three of the shapes had released a self-titled disc of selected songs and recordings from early years. 
Presently four members are tweaking their eclectic alternative prog pop sounds. 
 Cut Out Shapes(USA)2003 Track listing 
 Say You Need 
 Idiot box
 General 
 Not An Escape 
 Blighter 
 Ripe 
 stupid little crutch - Fan Video 
 TrAsHmAn
 underground
 Conflicts Collide 
 so far so good -Fan Video 
 strangest dream

 Cut Out Shapes (UK) members 
 Chris Wood – lead guitar (UK)
 Chris Ward – vocals, bass (UK)
 Toni – keyboards (tracks 1 and 2) (UK)
 Will Jackson – engineering
 Cut out shapes – mixing
Cut Out Shapes (UK) Released on CD and digital download in November 2009, Sea of Tranquility is a three-track EP. Its lead track, Sea of Tranquility could be described as reminiscent of Queens of the Stone Age

Sea of Tranquility EP track listing

 Sea of Tranquility
 Desert Song
 Past Lives

Personnel
 Chris Wood – lead guitar (UK)
 Chris Ward – vocals, bass (UK)
 Toni – keyboards (tracks 1 and 2) (UK)
 Will Jackson – engineering
 Cut out shapes – mixing

Cut Out Shapes (Debut Album) (UK)

Released on CD and digital download on 21 April 2014, Cut Out Shapes  is the self-titled debut album. Its lead tracks released for radio and digital download are Backwards Philosophy (January 2014), When the river runs dry (February 2014), Walking on Water (March 2014), Celestial Secrecy (April 2014), Nightmare (January 2012), and Never Change (Summer 2011)

Track listing

 Celestial Secrecy
 Ecstasy
 Digital Dreams
 Backwards Philosophy
 Walking On Water
 Open Your Eyes
 Nightmare
 Never Change
 Let It Go
 When The River Runs Dry
 Executive Decision
 Past Lives

Personnel
 Chris Wood – lead guitar, bass
 Chris Ward – vocals, bass
 Connor, Alex, Jason – drums
 Toni, Chris – keyboards
 Simon Humphrey, Alistair Groves – engineering
 Cut out shapes – mixing

References

External links
 Review of Cut Out Shapes' debut album on Leeds Music Scene
 Band's official website: www.cutoutshapes.co.uk
 http://www.leedsmusicscene.net/article/18368/
 http://www.soundspheremag.com/reviews/cd/cut-out-shapes-sea-of-tranquillity/
 http://www.leedsmusicscene.net/article/16099/

English alternative rock groups